The San Joaquin Valley Railroad  is one of several short line railroad companies and is part of the Pacific Region Division of Genesee & Wyoming Inc. It operates over about  of owned or leased track primarily on several lines in California's Central Valley/San Joaquin Valley around Fresno and Bakersfield. The SJVR has trackage rights over Union Pacific (formerly Southern Pacific) between Fresno, Goshen, Famoso, Bakersfield and Algoso. The SJVR also operated for the Tulare Valley Railroad (TVRR) from Calwa to Corcoran and Famoso.

There were two former San Joaquin Valley Railroads. One was incorporated by Leland Stanford and Associates in 1868 to build an  line from Lathrop, California to the Stanislaus River and was consolidated in 1870 into the Central Pacific Railroad.

In 1991, the SJVR operated the entire former SP line from Fresno to Famoso, but a portion north of Famoso was later abandoned.

SJVR interchanges with the BNSF Railway at Fresno and Bakersfield and with the Union Pacific at Fresno and Goshen Junction.

SJVR was originally owned by Kyle Railways. In 1992, the SJVR was created to obtain and operate several branch lines from the Southern Pacific. From 1992 to 1997, the SJVR was owned by Kyle Railways. In 1997, SJVR's parent, Kyle Railways, was sold to States Rail. In 2002 SJVR's new parent, States Rail, was purchased by RailAmerica. Genesee & Wyoming Inc. controlled RailAmerica in December 2012. Today the SJVR remains a shortline within the Genesee & Wyoming family of railroads.

Lines operated by SJVR

Line names taken from CPUC data.
 Fresno – Exeter – Strathmore (Exeter Subdivision; former SP)
 Exeter – Goshen Jct. (Goshen Subdivision; former SP)
 Goshen Jct. – Hanford – Huron (Hanford Subdivision; former SP)
 Burrel – Helm – Tranquility – Ingle (Riverdale Branch; former SP)
 Oxalis – Mendota – Ingle – Kerman – Fresno (West Side Subdivision; former SP)
 Fresno – Clovis (Clovis Subdivision; former AT&SF and SP)
 Famoso – Hollis (North Joint Subdivision; former SP)
 Maltha – Oil Jct. (Oil City Subdivision; former AT&SF/SP)
 Oil Jct. – Landco (Landco Subdivision; former AT&SF)
 Bakersfield – Gosford – Buttonwillow (Buttonwillow Subdivision; former SP)
 Gosford – Millux (Sunset Subdivision; former Sunset Railway)
 Algoso – Arvin (Arvin Subdivision; former AT&SF/SP)
 Trackage rights over UP from Fresno – Algoso (near Bakersfield) via Goshen Jct. (former SP)

History

West Side Line
This mainline route was formerly known as Southern Pacific's "West Side Line" and at one time extended from Tracy, California and then south through the West side of the San Joaquin Valley (I-5 corridor) via Patterson, Gustine, Newman, Los Banos, Oxalis and then east to Fresno via Ingle and Kerman. California Northern Railroad now operates the northern section of the line from Tracy - Los Banos. SJVR operates the southern section of the line from Oxalis to Fresno and was at one time owned by Port Railroads, Inc. (PRI; also a Kyle subsidiary) and operated by the SJVR. On April 24, 1996, the PRI was merged into the SJVR. Both the PRI and SJVR were already Kyle Railway subsidiaries. The section of track between Los Banos and Oxalis was abandoned by Southern Pacific in 1993 and the tracks were removed soon after.

The Southern Pacific constructed the track from Tracy to Newman (37 miles) and from Los Banos to Armona (near Fresno) in 1891. Southern Pacific's overnight Owl passenger train (#57/58) operated over this line between San Francisco and Los Angeles into 1965.

Exeter Subdivision
In 2008, the Surface Transportation Board approved the abandonment of the section of track between Strathmore and Jovista. This left the communities of Strathmore, Porterville, Terra Bella, Ducor, and Richgrove without any rail service. Tulare County has recently broken off negotiations with the SJVR to purchase this section of track to preserve it for future use and possible reactivation. However, beginning in September 2010, the tracks were being removed by the SJVR and the job was completed with the entire line having been pulled up in mid November. The future of this line is very much in doubt and with the rails having now been removed, it's extremely unlikely that trains will ever traverse that corridor again. As of March 2015, the SJVR has embargoed the line with the rails spiked at the south end of Exeter with some crossing signals south already having been partially dismantled. This section of track, which runs approximately 8 miles to Lindsay is now pending formal abandonment whereupon the rails are expected to be immediately pulled up upon STB approval. The sections from Exeter to Dinuba along with former ATSF track between Lindsay and Exeter were expected to follow given their poor condition and lack of use however as of April 2022 it has yet to happen.

Traffic
The railroad's main traffic sources are petroleum gas and agricultural products. In 2008, the SJVR hauled around 39,000 carloads.

Rolling stock
The railroad operates GP15-1s, GP40-2s, GP28s, GP20s, GP38s, GP38-2s, BL20-2s, and SE24Bs.

See also

List of United States railroads
List of California railroads
RailAmerica

References 

Edward A. Lewis, American Shortline Railway Guide 5th ed. (Kalmbach Publishing, 1996)
Mike Walker, SPV's Comprehensive Railroad Atlas of North America - California/Nevada Post Merger Edition, (Steam Powered Publishing & SPV, 1997) Ownership and detail of rail lines.

External links

California railroads
Regional railroads in the United States
RailAmerica
Companies based in Tulare County, California
Spin-offs of the Southern Pacific Transportation Company
Transportation in Fresno County, California
Transportation in Kern County, California
Transportation in Kings County, California
Transportation in Tulare County, California